Posterior column ataxia-retinitis pigmentosa syndrome (PCARP) is an autosomal recessive genetic disorder of the human eye, attributed to mutation of a gene] originally dubbed AXPC1 which was identified as a mutation in the FLCVR1 gene. Generally rare, a Pennsylvania Mennonite variant has been estimated to have a population allele prevalence close to 1% due to founder effects.

Clinical phenotype 

The syndrome was described having childhood-onset symptoms with sensory neuropathy characterized by proprioceptive loss with retinitis pigmentosa presenting with concentric visual field loss. By adulthood patients were blind with ataxia.

References

Channelopathies
Blindness
Disorders of choroid and retina
Autosomal recessive disorders